Al-Maarif University College is a private Iraqi university established in 1993 in Anbar, Iraq.

See also 
 List of universities in Iraq

Educational institutions established in 1993
Maarif
1993 establishments in Iraq